Asotin County is a county in the U.S. state of Washington. As of the 2020 census, the population was 22,285. The county seat is at Asotin, and its largest city is Clarkston. The county was created out of Garfield County in 1883 and derives its name from a Nez Perce word meaning "Eel Creek." Asotin County is part of the Lewiston–Clarkston metropolitan area, which includes Nez Perce County, Idaho, and Asotin County.

History
The area delineated by the future Washington state boundary began to be colonized at the start of the nineteenth century, both by Americans and Canadians. However, the majority of Canadian exploration and interest in the land was due to the fur trade, whereas American settlers were principally seeking land for agriculture and cattle raising. The Treaty of 1818 provided for dual control of this area by US and Canadian government officials. During this period, the future Washington Territory was divided into two administrative zones: Clark County and Lewis County (made official in 1845).

The dual-control concept was unwieldy and led to continual argument, and occasional conflict. The status of the Washington area was settled in 1846, when the Oregon Treaty ceded the land south of latitude 49 degrees North to American control.

In 1854, Skamania County was split from the original Clark County. Later that year, Walla Walla County was split from the new Skamania County. In 1875, Columbia County was split from Walla Walla County, and in 1881, a portion of Columbia County was set off to form Garfield County. The southeastern portion of Garfield County was partitioned in 1883 to form Asotin County. The 1883 boundary of Asotin has remained unchanged since then.

Geography
It is the fifth-smallest county in Washington by area. It is part of the Palouse, a wide and rolling prairie-like region of the middle Columbia basin.

Geographic features
Snake River
Sagebrush
Joseph Canyon

Major highways
 U.S. Route 12

Adjacent counties
Whitman County – north
Nez Perce County, Idaho – east
Wallowa County, Oregon – south
Garfield County – west

National protected area
Umatilla National Forest (part)

Demographics

2010 census
As of the 2010 census, there were 21,623 people, 9,236 households, and 5,914 families living in the county. The racial makeup of the county was 94.3% white, 1.4% American Indian, 0.5% Asian, 0.4% black or African American, 0.2% Pacific islander, 0.8% from other races, and 2.4% from two or more races. Those of Hispanic or Latino origin made up 3.0% of the population. In terms of ancestry, 32.4% were German, 14.8% were Irish, 13.7% were English, 7.5% were American, and 6.2% were Norwegian.

Of the 9,236 households, 27.7% had children under the age of 18 living with them, 47.5% were married couples living together, 12.1% had a female householder with no husband present, 36.0% were non-families, and 29.4% of all households were made up of individuals. The average household size was 2.32 and the average family size was 2.83. The median age was 43.5 years.

The median income for a household in the county was $41,665 and the median income for a family was $52,250. Males had a median income of $39,633 versus $28,475 for females. The per capita income for the county was $23,731. About 9.9% of families and 13.5% of the population were below the poverty line, including 21.1% of those under age 18 and 6.7% of those age 65 or over.

2000 census
As of the census of 2000, there were 20,551 people, 8,364 households, and 5,654 families living in the county. There were 9,111 housing units at an average density of 14 per square mile (6/km2). The racial makeup of the county was 95.62% White, 0.19% Black or African American, 1.27% Native American, 0.51% Asian, 0.02% Pacific Islander, 0.63% from other races, and 1.77% from two or more races. 1.95% of the population were Hispanic or Latino of any race. 25.9% were of German, 12.4% English, 11.9% Irish and 11.0% United States or American ancestry. 97.9% spoke English and 1.6% Spanish as their first language.

There were 8,364 households, out of which 31.00% had children under the age of 18 living with them, 51.40% were married couples living together, 11.90% had a female householder with no husband present, and 32.40% were non-families. 27.00% of all households were made up of individuals, and 11.70% had someone living alone who was 65 years of age or older. The average household size was 2.42 and the average family size was 2.91.

In the county, the population was spread out, with 25.50% under the age of 18, 8.10% from 18 to 24, 26.10% from 25 to 44, 24.00% from 45 to 64, and 16.30% who were 65 years of age or older. The median age was 39 years. For every 100 females, there were 91.10 males. For every 100 females age 18 and over, there were 86.30 males.

The median income for a household in the county was $33,524, and the median income for a family was $40,592. Males had a median income of $35,810 versus $22,218 for females. The per capita income for the county was $17,748.  About 11.60% of families and 15.40% of the population were below the poverty line, including 22.70% of those under age 18 and 6.70% of those age 65 or over.

Politics

Generally, Asotin County is considered a staunchly Republican area, although it has been known to vote for Democrats, especially on the state level. Currently the county is represented at the county commission level by two Republicans and one Independent.

In the 2004 Presidential election slightly over 60 percent of the vote went to Republican George W. Bush.  It was one of 11 of Washington's 39 counties where Bush received a lower percentage of the vote in 2004 than in 2000. Conversely, even though nearly 60 percent of voters selected the Democratic Governor Gary Locke in 2000, in 2004 the Democratic gubernatorial nominee Christine Gregoire received only 41 percent of the vote.

In 2004, 27% of presidential votes were cast from incorporated Clarkston, while 61% was from unincorporated suburbs of Clarkston (34% from Clarkston Heights, 12% from West Clarkston, 9% from South Clarkston, and 6% from Swallows Nest).  An additional 6% was cast from the incorporated city of Asotin, with rural areas around Asotin accounting for 4% of the vote and areas around the unincorporated community of Anatone making up 2% of the vote.

By and large, the most competitive areas are Clarkston and its suburbs. Democratic presidential nominee John Kerry won two precincts in 2004, one each in Clarkston and West Clarkston.  Bush received 54 percent of the vote in West Clarkston, 55 in Clarkston, and 57 percent in South Clarkston. However, he received larger victories of 64 percent in Clarkston Heights and 67 percent in Swallows Nest. Areas around both Asotin and Anatone delivered 2-to-1 victories, with the lone exception of one of the two incorporated Asotin precincts.

Communities

Cities

Asotin (County seat)
Clarkston

Census-designated places

Clarkston Heights-Vineland
West Clarkston-Highland

Unincorporated communities

Anatone
Cloverland
Jerry
Rogersburg
Silcott

See also
National Register of Historic Places listings in Asotin County, Washington
List of counties in Washington

Footnotes

Further reading
 Frank T. Gilbert, Historic Sketches: Walla Walla, Columbia and Garfield Counties, Washington Territory. Portland, OR: A.G. Walling Printing House, 1882.
 Elgin V. Kuykendall, Historic Glimpses of Asotin County, Washington. Clarkston, WA: Clarkston Herald, 1954.
 W.D. Lyman, Lyman's History of Old Walla Walla County, Embracing Walla Walla, Columbia, Garfield and Asotin Counties. In Two Volumes. Chicago: S.J. Clarke Publishing Co., 1918. Volume 1 | Volume 2
 Frederic Ambrose Shaver, An Illustrated History of Southeastern Washington, Including Walla Walla, Columbia, Garfield and Asotin Counties, Washington. Spokane, WA: Western Historical Publishing Co., 1906.

Images

External links
 Asotin County, Washington Official Page

 
1883 establishments in Washington Territory
Populated places established in 1883
Lewiston–Clarkston metropolitan area
Eastern Washington
Washington placenames of Native American origin